Amazonas Baroque Ensemble - ABE is a period instruments group based on Manaus, Amazonas, Brasil. Its members join themselves in Amazonas State University as Music and Musicology teachers and former students. Their aims included restoration of ancient Brazilian and Portuguese repertory, in a historically inspired approaching. Many of them joined Musicological research and practical performance projects sponsored by local and federal government agencies, such as Fundação de Amparo à Pesquisa do Amazonas, Petrobrás, Eletrobrás, among others. At this moment ABE performed in many Brazilian and European cities, including festivals (opera, sacred music) and stage productions.

Musicians 
 Mirian Abad - soprano
 Thelvana Freitas - contralto
 Fabiano Cardoso - tenor
 Roberto Paulo Silva - bass
 Gustavo Medina (Spalla), Tiago Soares, Juliana Lima Verde, Andreza Viana - baroque violin 1
 Manoella Costa, Silvia Raquel Lima, Raúl Gustavo Falcón - baroque violin 2
 Gabriel Lima, Elcione Santos - baroque viola
 Edoardo Sbaffi - baroque cello
 Diego Soares, Laércio Gomes - double bass
 Mário Trilha - harpsichord
 Vanessa Monteiro - organ
 Arley Raiol - baroque flute
 Márcio Páscoa, baroque flute and musical direction

Repertoire 
 Anonymous (Chiquitos, Bolivian Amazonia, 18th century) Trio Sonata
 Anonymous 18th century, Credo de São José do Tocantins
 Antonio Leal Moreira (1758–1819) - In te confida (Mardocheo recitative and aria from Ester (1786)
 Antonio Leal Moreira (1758–1819) Ah cangiar può d'affetto (Ismene aria in Gli eroi spartani, 1788)
 Antonio Leal Moreira (1758–1819) Amor di questa impresa (Alcibiade aria in Gli eroi spartani, 1788)
 Antonio Teixeira (1707–1774), Guerras do Alecrim e Mangerona (1737) opera jocoseria (in two acts)
-Libretto by Antonio José da Silva (1705-1739)
 Carlos de Seixas (1704–1742). Symphony movement
 Corelli, Arcangelo (1653–1713). Concerto Grosso (Op. 6 nº 8) Fatto per la notte di Natale
 Corelli, Arcangelo (1656–1713). Concerto Grosso (Op. 6, nº10)
 Corelli, Purcell, Handel and J.S.Bach. Trio Sonates
 David Perez (1711–1778). Trio sonata in D minor
 David Perez (1711-1778): Semplicetta tortorella, (Barsene aria in Demetrio, 1766)
 Dietrich Buxtehude (1637–1707). Jesu Meines Lebens Leben
 Giovanni Battista Pergolesi (1710–1736). Stabat Mater Dolorosa (from Stabat mater)*+
 Gluck, C. W. (1714–1787). Que farei sem o consorte. (Rozaura aria from A mulher amoroza)
 Haydn, Joseph (1732–1809). Die himmel erzahlen
 João de Deus do Castro Lobo (1794–1832). Seis Responsórios Fúnebre
 João de Sousa Carvalho (1745–1799). Con tanto riprove de tenere affeto (duet Giulietta e Armidoro in L'amore industrioso, 1769)
 João de Sousa Carvalho (1745–1799). Trio (Penelope, Ulisse and Icario in Penelope nella partenza da Sparta, 1782)
 João de Sousa Carvalho (1745–1799). Se l'interno affano mio (Alcione ária in Alcione, 1787)
 João de Sousa Carvalho. Padre, amico, non piangete (Isacco aria, from Isacco figura del redentor)
 José Maurício Nunes Garcia (1767–1830). Lauda Sion (1809)
 José Mauricio Nunes Garcia (1767–1830). Laudate Dominum
 José Mauricio Nunes Garcia (1767–1830). Laudate Pueri
 José Maurício Nunes Garcia (1767–1830). Creator alme siderum
 José Maurício Nunes Garcia (1767–1830). Te Christe solum novimus (1800)*
 José Palomino (1755–1810). Concert for violin (ca.1804, first movement)
 José Palomino (1755–1810). Harpsichord concerto
 Niccolo Jommelli (1714-1774): Ah, non son io che parlo (Fulvia aria in Ezio, 1772)
 Niccolò Jommelli (1714–1774). Nasce al bosco in rozza cuna, (Varo aria in Ezio, 1772)
 Nicolò Porpora (1686–1768). Lungi dal ben che s'ama (aria from Or che d'orrido verno)*
 Telemann, Georg Phillip (1681–1767). Ouverture e minor for flute and strings

Videos 
1. Antonio Leal Moreira (1858-1819). Ismene Aria "Ah cangiar non puo d'affetto" from opera "Gli Eroi Spartani" (Lisboa, 1787) - libreto by Gaetano Martinelli 
2. José Palomino (1755-1810). Harpsichord concerto (1785) - 1st part 
3. José Palomino (1755-1810). Harpsichord concerto (1785) - 2nd part 
4. José Maurício Nunes Garcia (1767-1830). "Te Christe Solum Novimus" 
5. Niccolò Jommelli (1714-1774). Aria "Nasce al bosco in rozza cuna" from opera "Ezio in Roma" (Bolonha, 1772) - libreto by Pietro Metastasio

Gallery

References 

Baroque music groups
Brazilian musical groups